"En Rouge et Noir" is a 1986 French single recorded by Jeanne Mas, from her album Femmes d'aujourd'hui. It achieved a great success in France, topping the chart during 1986 summer. At present, it is undoubtedly the most known song of this artist.

Music video and cover versions
In the music video, Jeanne Mas makes up and chooses dresses in a store, and carries out a photo meeting. At the time of the chorus, the singer appears in a band film which passes through the screen.

In 2005, the song was covered by Jean-Jacques Goldman, Lorie, Gérard Jugnot and Liane Foly at the time of Les Enfoirés's tour.

Versions
There are different versions of the song : a 1983 version with a different chorus appeared on Les années chansons, published by the magazine Platine. This one, released without the singer's agreement, was prohibited of marketing ; in 1986. Two remixes were also recorded on 12", the "Special Remix 1" (available on Les plus grands succès de Jeanne Mas) and the "Spécial Remix 2" (available on limited edition of J'M – Le meilleur de Jeanne Mas). In 2006, the "Kamp house remix" was produced by DJ Esteban and is available on the first edition of album The Missing Flowers and on My 80's.

The song is available on several Jeanne Mas's albums : for example, Femmes d'aujourd'hui, Le Meilleur de Jeanne Mas (2001, track 14), Best of (6 September 2004, track 3). It features also on numerous 1980s compilations, such Classiques 80 and Le Top : 20 ans de tubes, Vol. 1. "En Rouge et Noir" is also included in a remix version recorded by Jeanne Mas on her album My 80's Remixes and More and carried out by Roberto Zaneli.

Chart performances
On the French SNEP Singles Chart, the single debuted at number 14 on 17 May 1986. It reached No. 1 seven weeks later and stayed at this position for two consecutive weeks. It had concurrently 16 weeks in the top 10 and 23 weeks in the top 50. It left the chart on 25 October 1986.

It was certified Gold by the SNEP. With "En Rouge et Noir", Jeanne Mas became the first artist to take down a second number in France.

Track listings
 12" maxi

A-side :
 "En Rouge et Noir" (special remix 1) – 5:00
B-side :
 "En Rouge et Noir" (special remix 2) – 5:17

 7" single

A-side :
 "En Rouge et Noir" – 4:32
B-side :
 "Plus forte que l'océan" – 4:09

Charts and certifications

Weekly charts

Year-end charts

Certifications

References

1986 singles
Jeanne Mas songs
SNEP Top Singles number-one singles
Songs written by Romano Musumarra